Two by-elections were held in West Bengal on 29 January 2018 following the death of the incumbents Member of Noapara (Vidhan Sabha constituency) Madhusudan Ghose of the Indian National Congress and Uluberia (Lok Sabha constituency) M.P Sultan Ahmed (politician) of All India Trinamool Congress).

Winners
Both seats were won by the All India Trinamool Congress Candidates, Noapara (Vidhan Sabha constituency) seat won by Sunil Singh who is the brother-in-law of Arjun singh, and Uluberia (Lok Sabha constituency) seat won by Sajda Ahmed, the widow of Sultan Ahmed (politician).

References

By-elections in India
2018 elections in India
Elections in West Bengal
2010s in West Bengal